Ima Robot is the first full-length album by Ima Robot. It was released on Virgin Records in 2003.

Track listing
All tracks written by Alex Ebert.
"Dynomite" – 2:22
"Song #1" – 2:27
"Alive" – 3:12
"Scream" – 3:51
"A Is for Action" – 2:21
"Dirty Life" – 3:42
"Let's Talk Turkey" – 3:08
"Philosophofee" – 3:16
"12=3 (Here Come the Doctors)" – 3:10
"Here Come the Bombs" – 2:39
"What Are We Made From?" – 9:05 (4:48 on Japanese release)
"I'm Your Bitch" – 4:23 (Japanese release)
"Strangler's Theme" – 9:27 (Japanese release)

The hidden track "Black Jettas" is appended to the last song after a period of silence on both the UK, American and Japanese releases.

The recording sessions for this album also resulted in numerous B-Sides. The total amount of songs recorded by the band for the album is around 30. Some of these songs are still lost/not released to the public. Officially released B-Sides include:

- "STD Dance"
- "Ages of Ruin"
- "Sine Your Life Away"
- "Sex Symbols on Parade"
- "The Beat Goes On"
- "10:10" (also known as "Sexy")

Unofficially released B-Sides include:
- "Spearmint Whino"
- "Twist & Shout"
- "Leo's Waltz"

Lost songs that are confirmed to exist include:
- "Chip off the Block" (Different from the versions that appear on the 2001 Demo CD and the 2006 album Monument to the Masses)
- "New Negatives"

Tracks that are theorized to be recorded during these sessions include:
- "Apples"
- "Dragons and Queens"
- "Ancient Sluts"

In other media
 "A Is for Action" was featured in the video game SSX 3.
 "Scream" was featured in episode 4 of season 4 of the US drama series Queer as Folk.

References

2003 debut albums
Albums produced by Josh Abraham
Ima Robot albums
Virgin Records albums